is a high-speed Shinkansen service operated in Japan, on the Tōhoku Shinkansen by East Japan Railway Company (JR East) since 2002 and on the Hokkaido Shinkansen by JR Hokkaido since 26 March 2016. These services were inaugurated with the opening of the Tohoku Shinkansen extension to Hachinohe on 1 December 2002.

The name "Hayate" has not been used previously on any train service in Japan. The name was chosen with input from the public; roughly translated, it means a strong or violent wind; however, it carries positive connotations of speed and power.

History

Introduction 
In December 2002, the Tohoku Shinkansen extended to Hachinohe. As a result, the Hayate was introduced, in order to serve the newly extended section between Morioka and Hachinohe. Hayate trains ran between Tokyo and Hachinohe, and skips all stations between Ōmiya and Sendai. The Hayate was established as the fastest service on the Tohoku Shinkansen at that time, which also established its position as the predecessor of the Hayabusa. All seats in Hayate trains require reservation, due to the popularity of Shinkansen services from Tokyo to the Tohoku region. Hayate trains were operated by 10-car E2 series units, which ran at a top speed of 275 km/h.

Shin-Aomori Extension 
And on 19 November 2011, E5 series trainsets, with maximum speeds of 320 km/h, were introduced to the line, with some of them used on Hayate services. The introduction of the E5 series resulted in the introduction of the Hayabusa, which replaced the Hayate's role as the fastest train on the line. In addition, currently E5 series Hayate services still run at a top speed of 275 km/h. JR East have reduced Hayate services over the years, and unify the discontinued Hayate services to Hayabusa services. It now serves as a complementary service to the Hayabusa.

Opening of Hokkaido Shinkansen 
, one return service operates daily between Morioka and Shin-Hakodate-Hokuto, and one return service daily operates between Shin-Aomori and Shin-Hakodate-Hokuto. These services are formed of 10-car E5 or H5 series trainsets.

Past services with Komachi 
In the past Hayate services used to couple with Komachi services from Tokyo to Morioka, where the Komachi cars are uncoupled and proceed to Akita Station via the Akita Shinkansen. However currently all Komachi train now couple with Hayabusa trains, so all Hayate trains now run alone.

Stations and service pattern
Hayate services stop at the following stations.

Travel time 

 Morioka - Shin-Hakodate-Hokuto: 2 hours 9 minutes
 Shin-Aomori - Shin-Hakodate-Hokuto: 1 hour 6 minutes

Rolling stock
 E5 series (since November 2011)
 H5 series (since 26 March 2016)

Former rolling stock
 E2 series (1 December 2002 - 16 March 2019)

Train formations
Hayate services are operated by 10-car JR East  E5 series or JR Hokkaido H5 series train sets, with car 1 at the Morioka end. All seats are reserved and no-smoking.

E5 & H5 series Hayate

See also
 List of named passenger trains of Japan

References

External links
JR East E2 series Hayate 
 JR East E5 series Hayabusa/Hayate/Yamabiko/Nasuno 

Tōhoku Shinkansen
Hokkaido Shinkansen
Railway services introduced in 2002
Named Shinkansen trains